San Mauro Castelverde (Sicilian: Santu Màuru) is a comune in the Metropolitan City of Palermo in Sicily, southern Italy.  San Mauro Castelverde had an estimated population of 1,634.

Notable persons from San Mauro Castelverde include Santa Biondo, who immigrated to the United States as a child and became famous as an opera singer during the 1930s.

International relations

 
San Mauro Castelverde is twinned with:
  Quilmes, Argentina
 Rush,  Ireland

References

 

Municipalities of the Metropolitan City of Palermo